Cryptophlebia heterospina is a species of moth of the family Tortricidae first described by Józef Razowski in . It is found on Seram Island in Indonesia. The habitat consists of bamboo and secondary forests.

The wingspan is about 24 mm. The forewings are brownish cream, but cream in the dorsoposterior part of the wing. The hindwings are brown grey, but more cream, strigulated (finely streaked) with brownish in the apical area.

Etymology
The species name refers to a difference in the spines of the cucullus to Cryptophlebia illepida and is derived from Greek heteros (meaning different).

References

Moths described in 2013
Grapholitini